The Gwinnett Place Transit Center (also Gwinnett County Transit Center) is a regional bus station and a major stop for Gwinnett County Transit buses in Gwinnett County and Atlanta, Georgia. The terminal contains a seating area, and is in close proximity to the Gwinnett Place & Sugarloaf business districts.

Bus services

30: Connecting Duluth to Lilburn via South Berkely Road to Gwinnett Transit Center via Indian Trail - Lilburn Road. This portion is one-way only and is known as the "Lilburn Loop." It runs Burns to Pleasant Hill to Lawrenceville Highway to Rockbridge to Dickens back to Indian Trail-Lilburn Road. Frequency is 30 minutes peak to 60 minutes off peak.
40: Connecting Gwinnett Transit Center to the City of Lawrenceville via Old Norcross Rd. Atkison Road "Gwinnett Tech" through Old Norcross and Historic Downtown Lawrenceville and through portions which are only One-Way Sugarloaf Parkway. Frequency is 30 minutes peak to 60 minutes off peak.

Future expansion 
In 2017, Gwinnett Commissioners purchased additional property adjacent to the transit center for future expansion plans.

See also

References

External links 
 Official Website

Bus transportation in Georgia (U.S. state)
Transit centers in the United States
 
Transportation in Gwinnett County, Georgia
Buildings and structures in Gwinnett County, Georgia